Enteromius taeniopleura is a species of ray-finned fish in the  family Cyprinidae.
It is found in Burundi, Democratic Republic of the Congo, Tanzania, and Zambia.
Its natural habitat is rivers.

References

Enteromius
Taxa named by George Albert Boulenger
Fish described in 1917
Taxonomy articles created by Polbot